Zoya Blyuvas (born 1936) is a former diver. Blyuvas competed for the Soviet Union in the 3 meter springboard at the 1956 Summer Olympics and finished in 11th place.

References

External links
 

1936 births
Living people
Olympic divers of the Soviet Union
Divers at the 1956 Summer Olympics
Soviet female divers